The Swedenborg Society was founded in 1810 to translate into English and publish the works of Emanuel Swedenborg. Its original name was the London Society for Printing and Publishing the Works of Emanuel Swedenborg.

The Society's headquarters, Swedenborg House, is a grade II listed building, built as a residence in about 1760 and acquired by the Society in 1925.

References

External links

 A short film about Swedenborg http://www.cultureunplugged.com/

Clubs and societies in London
Emanuel Swedenborg